Jean-Marc Todeschini (born 12 March 1952) is a former member of the Senate of France, who represented the Moselle department.  He is a member of the Socialist Party. Teacher and elementary school principal and finally Inspector of Education, he was elected Senator of Moselle on 23 September 2001. Taking advantage of the great division of the right, left Moselle in 2001 succeeded in obtaining for the first time three senators. On 25 September 2011 he was elected Senator of Moselle, and on 5 October 2011 he was appointed Prime Quaestor Senate.

References
Page on the Senate website

1952 births
Living people
French Senators of the Fifth Republic
Socialist Party (France) politicians
Senators of Moselle (department)
People from Longwy
French people of Italian descent
Politicians from Grand Est